Cris Morena Group is a production company, in charge of creating mostly youth programming and formats. Founded in 2002 by Cris Morena, it is one of the main production companies in Argentina and is based in Buenos Aires. Unlike other production companies, Cris Morena Group not only devises TV formats, but also generates ancillary businesses such as CDs, magazines, licenses, musicals and theatrical productions.

Cris Morena productions are also adapted across the world. Her shows have been adapted to, among others, India, Brazil, Mexico, Colombia and Chile.

Most CMG productions are co-produced with RGB Entertainment, except for Rebelde Way and Rincón de Luz which were co-produced by Israeli company Dori Media Group. CMG is responsible for the creative part of the projects while RGB is in charge of the business, contracts and finances.

Cris Morena Group was temporarily closed for two years. Its comeback production is weekly youth-oriented fiction Aliados, co-produced with Telefe.

TV series

Rebelde Way
See Rebelde Way.

Year: 2002-2003
Main Cast: Benjamin Rojas, Camila Bordonaba, Luisana Lopilato, Felipe Colombo, Catherine Fulop, Martin Seefeld, Boy Olmi.
Notes: Originally broadcast in Canal 9 and America 2. Co-produced by Dori Media. Format adapted in Mexico, India, Brazil, Portugal and Chile.

Rincón de Luz
See Rincón de Luz.

Year: 2003
Main Cast: Soledad Pastorutti, Guido Kaczka.
Notes: Originally broadcast in Canal 9 and America 2. Co-produced by Dori Media.

Rebelde (Mexican TV se)

see Rebelde (Mexican TV series)

Year: 2004-2006

Main Cast: Dulce María, Anahí, Christopher von Uckermann, Alfonso Herrera and Enrique Rocha, Juan Ferrara.

Note: Rebelde (Mexican TV series) was a Mexican remake to the Argentinian original series Rebelde Way

Floricienta
See Floricienta.

Year: 2004-2005
Cast: Florencia Bertotti, Isabel Macedo, Juan Gil Navarro, Benjamin Rojas, Fabio Di Tomaso
Notes: Originally broadcast in Canal 13. Co-produced alongside RGB Entertainment. Rebroadcast around the world by Disney Channel. Format adapted in Brazil, Mexico, Chile and Colombia.

Amor Mío
Year: 2005
Cast: Romina Yan, Damian de Santo
Notes: Morena's first sitcom and primetime show, aired at Telefe in 2005. Format was successfully adapted in Mexico and in Russia. Co-produced alongside RGB Entertainment.

Alma Pirata
Year: 2006
Cast: Benjamin Rojas, Fabian Mazzei, Luisana Lopilato, Mariano Martínez, Nicolás Vázquez, Isabel Macedo
Notes: Aired at Telefe in 2006. Co-produced with RGB Entertainment.

Casi Angeles
Year: 2007-2010
Cast: Nicolás Vázquez, Emilia Attias, Mariano Torre, Julia Calvo, Gimena Accardi, Jimena Barón, Mariana Espósito, María Eugenia Suárez, Peter Lanzani, Gaston Dalmau, Nicolas Riera.
Notes: Aired at Telefe between 2007 and 2010, with four seasons.

B&B: Bella y Bestia
Year: 2008
Cast: Romina Yan, Damián de Santo

Jake & Blake
Year 2009
Cast Benjamín Rojas
Notes: Shot in English and aired at Disney Channel across the world.

Aliados
Year 2013
Cast Peter Lanzani, Pablo Martínez
Notes: Cris Morena return to production after a two-year hiatus. Co-produced with Telefe.

Movies

Chiquititas: Rincón de Luz
Year: 2001
Cast: Romina Yan, Facundo Arana, Felipe Colombo, Camila Bordonaba, Luisana Lopilato, Benjamín Rojas, Agustín Sierra, Nadia Di Cello and many others.

Erreway: 4 Caminos
See 4 Caminos.

Year: 2004
Cast: Felipe Colombo, Camila Bordonaba, Luisana Lopilato, Benjamín Rojas, Rolly Serrano
Production: Yair Dori International, RGB Entertainment
Note: Music from Erreway's album Memoria is used in this movie.

Music
Cris Morena started her successful career as a songwriter in 1980 and since then she has written a formidable number of hits for renowned artists as Sergio Denis, Cae, Sandra Mihanovich and Flavia Palmiero - to name a few. She has also written songs for big-time television shows such as Ritmo de la noche, Mi familia es un dibujo, Jugate conmigo, Cebollitas, Floricienta, Chiquititas, Verano del 98, Rebelde Way and Alma Pirata, among many others.

Her songs have been chart-topping hits not just in Argentina, but also in Latin America, Asia and Europe. Cris Morena has over 500 songs registered under her name and she is one of the most successful and prolific authored of music for children and teenagers of the last couple decades.

External links
https://web.archive.org/web/20110114215959/http://www.anahig.org/
 :es:Cris Morena Group#Pel.C3.ADculas producidas (in Spanish)

Mass media companies established in 2002
Record label distributors
Entertainment companies of Argentina
2002 establishments in Argentina